Xabber (from XMPP and Jabber) is a XMPP client for the Android Operating System. It is developed as an open source Project on GitHub and is licensed under the GNU GPL v.3 license. The original developers are from a software company called Redsolution, Inc. Xabber is available on the Android Play Store and on F-Droid.

Xabber supports Off-the-Record Messaging to provide encrypted communication. Until 30 January 2013 was closed source, but was then published on GitHub as a decision by the development team.

Functionality 
Because Xabber implements XMPP Protocols, it is compatible with any XMPP Server. Xabber offers no server infrastructure of its own, but it has a few popular services pre-configured. The developers confirmed compatibility with Ejabberd, Prosody and Openfire. The application has integration with the systemwide Android Contacts.

Xabber uses Off the Record Messaging in combination TLS to provide strong Security (Perfect Forward Secrecy). Since 30 September 2013 Xabber uses Orbot as an additional Layer of Protection.  Orbot is used to access the Tor Network to obfuscate the connections between sender and recipient. When used in conjunction with a privately owned XMPP Server the system is less insecure.

Extensions 
Xabber supports the following XMPP protocol Extensions:
 RFC-3920: Core
 RFC-3921: Instant Messaging and Presence
 XEP-0030: Service Discovery
 XEP-0054: vcard-temp
 XEP-0078: Non-SASL Authentication
 XEP-0085: Chat State Notifications
 XEP-0091: Legacy Delayed Delivery
 XEP-0115: Entity Capabilities
 XEP-0128: Service Discovery Extensions
 XEP-0138: Stream Compression
 XEP-0147: XMPP URI Scheme Query Components
 XEP-0153: vCard-Based Avatars
 XEP-0184: Message Delivery Receipts
 XEP-0199: XMPP Ping
 XEP-0203: Delayed Delivery

XEP (XMPP Extension Protocols) are standardized extensions for XMPP. The full details on the extensions can be found at xmpp.org/extensions.

See also 
 Comparison of instant messaging clients

References

External Links 
 
 
 
 

Android (operating system) software
Free and open-source Android software
Free XMPP clients